Muhammad Waris Aziz is a Pakistani politician who had been a member of the Provincial Assembly of the Punjab from August 2018 till January 2023, defeating Rana Sanaullah. Waris became the Chairman of PHA, Faisalabad in 2020.

Political career

He was elected to the Provincial Assembly of the Punjab as a candidate of Pakistan Tehreek-e-Insaf from Constituency PP-113 (Faisalabad-XVII in 2018 Pakistani general election.

References

Living people
Pakistan Tehreek-e-Insaf MPAs (Punjab)
Year of birth missing (living people)